Ryan Pearson (born February 27, 1990) is an American professional basketball player who last played for the Rain or Shine Elasto Painters of the Philippine Basketball Association (PBA). He is known for his All-American college career at George Mason University.

College career

Pearson, a 6'6" small forward from Far Rockaway, Queens, New York, played high school basketball at Christ the King Regional High School in Queens.  He committed to play college basketball at George Mason in Fairfax, Virginia for head coach Jim Larranaga.  In his freshman season of 2008–09, Pearson 7.0 points and 3.6 rebounds per game, earning a spot on the Colonial Athletic Association (CAA) All-rookie team.  As a sophomore, Pearson entered the Patriots' starting lineup, averaging 11.9 points and 6.4 rebounds per game.

As a junior, Pearson led the Patriots to a 26–7 record and a CAA regular-season championship.  George Mason went to the 2011 NCAA Tournament, losing to #1 seed Ohio State in the third round.  Pearson increased his averages to 14.2 points and 6.7 rebounds per game and gaining second-team all-CAA honors.  In his senior year, Pearson led the Patriots to a 24–9 record in new coach Paul Hewitt's first season.  Pearson again improved his production, averaging 17.0 points and 8.2 rebounds per game.  Pearson was named CAA player of the year and an honorable mention All-American by the Associated Press.  For his career, Pearson scored 1,626 points and collected 806 rebounds.

Professional career
On August 9, 2012, Pearson signed his first professional contract with BC Hoverla of the Ukrainian Super League.  Pearson started the 2013–14 season with Maccabi Ashdod of the Israeli Super League.  After a few games with Ashdod he moved to the Antwerp Giants in Belgium.

On July 14, 2019, he signed with Boulazac Basket Dordogne of the LNB Pro A. 

On November 6, 2022, Pearson signed with the Rain or Shine Elasto Painters of the Philippine Basketball Association (PBA) to replace Steve Taylor Jr. as the team's import for the 2022–23 PBA Commissioner's Cup.

References

External links
George Mason biography
FIBA profile

1990 births
Living people
Abejas de León players
Alba Fehérvár players
American expatriate basketball people in Belgium
American expatriate basketball people in France
American expatriate basketball people in Hungary
American expatriate basketball people in Israel
American expatriate basketball people in Mexico
American expatriate basketball people in the Philippines
American expatriate basketball people in Ukraine
American expatriate basketball people in Uruguay
American men's basketball players
Antwerp Giants players
BC Hoverla players
Basketball players from New York City
Boulazac Basket Dordogne players
George Mason Patriots men's basketball players
JDA Dijon Basket players
Le Mans Sarthe Basket players
Maccabi Ashdod B.C. players
People from Far Rockaway, Queens
Philippine Basketball Association imports
Power forwards (basketball)
Rain or Shine Elasto Painters players
Small forwards
Sportspeople from Queens, New York